Surendra Seeraj (born 7 September 1973 in Guelph, Ontario) is a Canadian cricket player. He is a right-handed batsman. He has played two matches for Canada, making his debut in the One Day International against Bermuda on 21 August 2006 and also playing in the ICC Americas Championship game against the USA shortly afterwards.

Sources
Cricket Archive profile

1973 births
Canada One Day International cricketers
Cricketers from Ontario
Living people
Sportspeople from Guelph
Wicket-keepers